Idas is a Messenian prince in Greek mythology.

Idas or IDAS may also refer to:

 Idas (bivalve),  a genus of molluscs
 IDAS (missile)
 Idas (mythology), several figures
 Rivière à Idas (English: Idas River), in Quebec, Canada
 Idas (crater), a crater on Saturn's moon Janus
 IDAS, an indoor distributed antenna system
 Indian Defence Accounts Service, provides financial and audit services to the Indian defence services
 International Design school for Advanced Studies, Hongik University, Seoul, South Korea

See also
 Ida (disambiguation)